Below is a list of National Amateur Boxing Light Heavyweight Champions, also known as United States Amateur Champions, along with the state or region which they represented.  The United States National Boxing Championships bestow the title of United States Amateur Champion on amateur boxers for winning the annual national amateur boxing tournament organized by USA Boxing, the national governing body for Olympic boxing and is the United States' member organization of the International Amateur Boxing Association (AIBA).  It is one of four premier amateur boxing tournaments, the other being the National Golden Gloves Tournament, which crowns its own amateur light heavyweight champion, the Police Athletic League Tournament, and the United States Armed Forces Tournament, all sending champions to the US Olympic Trials. It is contested at a 178 lb limit.

List
1913 – Joe Brown, Pawtucket, RI
1914 – W. Hanna, Toronto, ON, Canada
1915 – Edward Carr, Boston, MA
1916 – Patrick McCarthy, Roxbury, MA
1917 – Ted Jamieson, Milwaukee, WI
1918 – John McMinimen, Camp Devens, MA
1919 – Al Roche, Somerville, MA
1920 – J. Burke, Pittsburgh, PA
1921 – Mangu Larsen, New York, NY
1922 – Charles McKenna, New York, NY
1923 – Henry Fay, Pittsburgh, PA
1924 – Tom Kirby, Boston, MA
1925 – Henry Lamar, Washington, DC
1926 – Henry Lamar, Washington, DC
1927 – George Hoffman, New York, NY
1928 – Leon Lucas, Philadelphia, PA
1929 – Martin Levandowski, Grand Rapids, MI
1930 – Frank Tucker, San Francisco, CA
1931 – Tony Poloni, Reno, NV
1932 – Homer Brandeis, San Francisco, CA
1933 – Max Marke, Chicago, IL
1934 – Joe Louis, Detroit, MI
1935 – Joseph Bauer, Cleveland, OH
1936 – John Lasinski, New York, NY
1937 – Tim Hill, Detroit, MI
1938 – William Muldune, Cleveland, OH
1939 – Jimmy Reeves, Cleveland, OH
1940 – Vic Hutton, Farmersburg, IN
1941 – Shelton Bell, Wilberforce, OH
1942 – Bob Foxworth, St. Louis, MO
1943 – Bob Foxworth, St. Louis, MO
1944 – Ray Stadifer, Cleveland, OH
1945 – Richard Nutt, Alexandria, VA
1946 – Bob Foxworth, St. Louis, MO
1947 – Grant Butcher, San Francisco, CA
1948 – Grant Butcher, San Francisco, CA
1949 – Delopez Oliver, Honolulu, HI
1950 – Eldridge Thompson, Washington, DC
1951 – John Boutillier, Boston, MA
1952 – Eldridge Thompson, Washington, DC
1953 – Frank Perry, Lockland, OH
1954 – Warnell Lester, Baltimore, MD
1955 – John Horne, Washington, DC
1956 – John Horne, Omaha, NE
1957 – (Ignaz) Lindy Lindmoser, Vancouver, BC, Canada
1958 – Sylvester Banks, St. Louis, MO
1959 – Cassius Clay, Louisville, KY
1960 – Cassius Clay, Louisville, KY
1961 – Bob Christopherson, University of Wisconsin
1962 – Billy Joiner, Cincinnati, OH
1963 – Fred Lewis, US Air Force
1964 – Bob Christopherson, US Air Force
1965 – Roger Russell, Philadelphia, PA
1966 – John Griffin, Cleveland, OH
1967 – John Griffin, Cleveland, OH
1968 – Len Hutchins, Detroit, MI
1969 – Dave Matthews, Cleveland, OH
1970 – Nathaniel Jackson, Memphis, TN
1971 – Marvin Johnson, Indianapolis, IN
1972 – Hernando Molyneauz. New York, NY
1973 – D.C. Barker, Denver, CO
1974 – Leon Spinks, US Marines
1975 – Leon Spinks, US Marines
1976 – Leon Spinks, US Marines
1977 – Larry Strogen, Shert, LA
1978 – Elmer Martin, US Navy
1979 – Tony Tucker, Grand Rapids, MI
1980 – Jeff Lampkin
1981 – Alex DeLucia, Portland, OR
1982 – Bennie Heard, Augusta, GA
1983 – Ricky Womack, Detroit, MI
1984 – Loren Ross, US Army
1985 – Loren Ross, US Army
1986 – Loren Ross, US Army
1987 – Andrew Maynard, US Army
1988 – Andrew Maynard, US Army
1989 – Jeremy Williams, Long Beach, CA
1990 – Jeremy Williams, Long Beach, CA
1991 – Terry McGroom, Chicago, IL
1992 – Montell Griffin, Chicago, IL
1993 – Antonio Tarver, Orlando, FL
1994 – Benjamin McDowell, Fort Bragg, NC
1995 – Antonio Tarver, Orlando, FL
1996 – Anthony Stewart, Chicago, IL
1997 – Anthony Stewart, Chicago, IL
1998 – Olanda Anderson, Fort Carson, CO
1999 – Michael Simms Jr., Sacramento, CA
2000 – Olanda Anderson, Fort Carson, CO
2001 – DeAndrey Abron, Fort Carson, CO
2002 – Curtis Stevens, Brooklyn, NY
2003 – Andre Ward, Oakland, CA
2004 – Marcus “Marker” Johnson, Killeen, TX
2005 – William Rosinsky, Queens, NY
2006 – James Brumley,Manchester, KY 
2007 – Christopher Downs, Fort Carson, CO
2008 – Dorian Anthony, Lynwood, CA
2009 – Robert Brant, Oakdale, MN
2010 – Jeffery Spencer, Fountain, CO
2011 – Jesse Hart, Philadelphia, PA
2012 – Marcus Brown, Staten Island, NY
2015 – Heniel Alfonso Luciano, Brooklyn, New York
2016 - Devonte “Bully” Campbell, Manhattan, New York

References

Light heavy